Matt Bellassai is an American comedian and writer. He hosts the Unhappy Hour podcast and web series To Be Honest. He formerly starred in the BuzzFeed web series Wine About It, which attracted 3.5 million weekly viewers. He received the 2016 People's Choice Award for Favorite Social Media Star, and is the author of Everything Is Awful: And Other Observations, a collection of essays. Bellassai grew up in the Chicago suburbs of Alsip and Palos Heights, Illinois. He studied journalism at Northwestern University, and interned at the magazine In These Times. After graduation he moved to New York and joined BuzzFeed as a writer of humorous lists, and soon developed Whine About It, a series of videos featuring himself drinking wine and complaining. Bellassai is gay. He attended a Pride parade for the first time at the age of 19. He considers Honey Boo-Boo and Ellen DeGeneres as LGBTQ icons.

References

External links

Living people
21st-century American comedians
BuzzFeed people
American Internet celebrities
Northwestern University alumni
Year of birth missing (living people)
Gay comedians
LGBT people from Illinois
American gay writers
Writers from Illinois
Comedians from Illinois
21st-century American male writers
People from Palos Heights, Illinois